The men's  68 kg competition of the taekwondo events at the 2018 Mediterranean Games took place on the 30 of June at the Salou Pavilion.

Schedule 
All times are Central European Summer Time (UTC+2).

Results 

 Legend

 PTG — Won by Points Gap
 SUP — Won by superiority
 OT — Won on over time (Golden Point)
 DQ — Won by disqualification
 PUN — Won by punitive declaration
 WD — Won by withdrawal

Main bracket

References 

Taekwondo at the 2018 Mediterranean Games